Fantasy Island (stylized as FANTASY ISLⱯND) is an American fantasy drama television series created by Elizabeth Craft and Sarah Fain for Fox. It is a sequel to and maintains continuity with the original 1977 series. The series premiered on August 10, 2021, with a preview special, Welcome to the New Fantasy Island,  which aired two days before.

In November 2021, the series was renewed for a second season, and a holiday special aired on December 23, 2021. The second season premiered on January 2, 2023.

Cast and characters

Main 

 Roselyn Sánchez as Elena Roarke, a grand niece of Mr. Roarke from the original series
 Kiara Barnes as Ruby Akuda, Elena's associate co-host on the island
 John Gabriel Rodriquez as Javier (season 2; recurring season 1), the head of transportation on the island and Elena's love interest

Recurring 

 Daniel Lugo as Segundo (season 2; co-starring season 1)
 Gabriela Z. Hernández as Dr. Gina	(season 2; co-starring season 1)
 Alexa Mansour as Helene (season 2), Javier's daughter

Guest 
 Bellamy Young as Christine Collins (season 1)
 Odette Annable as Daphne (season 1)
 Dave Annable as Zev (season 1)
 Daphne Zuniga as Margot (season 1)
 Josie Bissett as Camille (season 1)
 Laura Leighton as Nettie (season 1)
 Leslie Jordan as Jasper (season 1)
 Rachael Harris as Tara Bendetti (season 2)
 Cheryl Hines as Jessica Warren (season 2)
 Jasika Nicole as Andi Nevinson (season 2)
 Zack Pearlman as Bobo (season 2)
 Teri Hatcher as Dolly (season 2)
 James Denton as Dutch (season 2)
 Andy Richter as Game Show Host (season 2)
 Joely Fisher as Joy Summers (season 2)
 Keiko Agena as Nancy (season 2)
 Melinda Clarke as Amber Graham (season 2)

Episodes

Series overview

Special (2021)

Season 1 (2021)

Season 2 (2023)

Production

Development 
On December 15, 2020, it was announced that Fox had ordered a contemporary adaptation of Fantasy Island created by Elizabeth Craft and Sarah Fain. On September 8, 2021, it was reported that a second season is in negotiations. On November 4, 2021, Fox renewed the series for a second season.

Casting
On April 21, 2021, Kiara Barnes had been cast in a regular role and John Gabriel Rodriquez had been cast in the recurring role. On April 27, 2021, Roselyn Sánchez was added to the cast as Elena Roarke. On May 5, 2021, it was announced that Bellamy Young would make a guest appearance in the show. On June 3, 2021, it was announced that Dave and Odette Annable would make a guest appearance in the show. On July 16, 2021, it was announced that Melrose Place stars Laura Leighton, Josie Bissett and Daphne Zuniga will make special guest appearances in the show.

On November 22, 2021, it was reported that Rodriquez had been promoted to a series regular for the second season. On April 25, 2022, Alexa Mansour had been cast in a recurring role. On January 11, 2023, it was announced that Teri Hatcher and James Denton are set to guest star for an episode.

Filming 
Filming took place in Puerto Rico.

Release
Fantasy Island premiered on Fox on August 10, 2021. On May 27, 2021, Fox released the first official trailer for the series. A behind-the-scenes special titled "Welcome to the New Fantasy Island" premiered on August 8, 2021, two days before the premiere. Upon the second season renewal, a two-hour holiday special episode titled "Welcome to the Snow Globe" was also announced. It aired on December 23, 2021. The second season premiered on January 2, 2023.

Reception

Critical response
The review aggregator website Rotten Tomatoes reports a 67% approval rating with an average rating of 6.6/10, based on 12 critic reviews. The website's critics consensus reads, "Fantasy Island flights of fancy aren't quite formed enough to make it a must-watch, but viewers looking for beautiful vistas and a bit of mystery could do worse." Metacritic, which uses a weighted average, assigned a score of 62 out of 100 based on 8 critics, indicating "generally favorable reviews".

Ratings

Special

Season 1

Season 2

References

External links 
 
 

2020s American anthology television series
2020s American drama television series
2021 American television series debuts
American fantasy drama television series
American fantasy television series
American sequel television series
English-language television shows
Fantasy Island
Fox Broadcasting Company original programming
LGBT-related television shows
Television series by Fox Entertainment
Television series by Sony Pictures Television
Television series set on fictional islands
Television shows filmed in Puerto Rico